The Sorbian languages are the Upper Sorbian language and Lower Sorbian language, two closely related and partially mutually intelligible languages spoken by the Sorbs, a West Slavic ethno-cultural minority in the Lusatia region of Eastern Germany. They are classified under the West Slavic branch of the Indo-European languages and are therefore closely related to the other two West Slavic subgroups: Lechitic and Czech–Slovak. Historically, the languages have also been known as Wendish (named after the Wends, the earliest Slavic people in modern Poland and Germany) or Lusatian.

The two Sorbian languages, each having its own literary standard, are Upper Sorbian, spoken by about 20,000–25,000 people in Saxony, and Lower Sorbian, spoken by about 7,000 people in Brandenburg.

History

After the settlement of the formerly Germanic territories (the part largely corresponding to the former East Germany) by the Slavic ancestors of the Sorbs in the 5th and 6th centuries CE, the Sorbian language (or its predecessors) had been in use in much of what was the southern half of Eastern Germany for several centuries, and still had its stronghold in (Upper and Lower) Lusatia, where it enjoys national protection and fostering to the present day.

For people living in the medieval Northern Holy Roman Empire and its precursors, especially for the Saxons, the Wends (Wende) were heterogeneous groups and tribes of Slavic peoples living near Germanic settlement areas, in the area west of the River Oder, an area later entitled Germania Slavica, settled by the Polabian Slav tribes in the north and by others, such as the Sorbs and the Milceni, further south (see Sorbian March).

The exact origin of the Sorbian language is uncertain. While some linguists consider it to be a transitory language between Lechitic and other non-Lechitic languages of West Slavic languages, others like Heinz Schuster-Šewc consider it a separate dialectical group of Proto-Slavic which is a mixture of Proto-Lechitic and South Slavic languages. Furthermore, while some consider it a single language which later diverged to two major dialects, others consider these dialects two separate languages. There exist significant differences in phonology, morphology, and lexicon between them. Several characteristics in Upper Sorbian language indicate a close proximity to Czech language which again are absent in Lower Sorbian language. According to some researchers the archaeological data cannot confirm the thesis about a single linguistic group yet supports the claim about two separated ethno-cultural groups with different ancestry whose respective territories correspond to Tornow-type ceramics (Lower Sorbian language) and Leipzig-type ceramics (Upper Sorbian language), both derivations of Prague culture.

Outside Lusatia, the Sorbian language has been superseded by German. From the 13th century on, the language suffered official discrimination. Bible translations into Sorbian provided the foundations for its writing system.

Geographic distribution
In Germany, Upper and Lower Sorbian are officially recognized and protected as minority languages. In the home areas of the Sorbs, both languages are recognized as second official languages next to German.

The city of Bautzen in Upper Lusatia is the centre of Upper Sorbian culture. Bilingual signs can be seen around the city, including the name of the city, "Bautzen/".
To the north, the city of Cottbus/Chóśebuz is considered the cultural centre of Lower Sorbian; there, too, bilingual signs are found.

Sorbian was also spoken in the small Sorbian ("Wendish") settlement of Serbin in Lee County, Texas, however no speakers remain there. Until 1949, newspapers were published in Sorbian. The local dialect was heavily influenced by surrounding speakers of German and English.

The German terms "Wends" (Wenden) and "Wendish" (wendisch/Wendisch) once denoted "Slav(ic)" generally; they are today mostly replaced by "Sorbs" (Sorben) and "Sorbian" (sorbisch/Sorbisch) with reference to Sorbian communities in Germany.

Endangered status
The use of Sorbian languages has been contracting for a number of years. The loss of Sorbian language use in emigrant communities, such as in Serbin, Texas, has not been surprising. But within the Sorbian homelands, there has also been a decrease in Sorbian identity and language use. In 2008, Sorbians protested three kinds of pressures against Sorbians: "(1.) the destruction of Sorbian and German-Sorbian villages as a result of lignite mining; (2.) the cuts in the network of Sorbian schools in Saxony; (3.) the reduction of financial resources for the Sorbian institutions by central government."

A study of Upper Sorbian found a number of trends that go against language vitality. There are policies that have led to "unstable diglossia". There has been a loss of language domains in which speakers have the option to use either language, and there is a disruption of the patterns by which the Sorbian language has traditionally been transmitted to the next generation. Also, there is no strong written tradition and there is not a broadly accepted formal standardized form of the language(s). There is a perception of the loss of language rights, and there are negative attitudes towards the languages and their speakers.

Linguistic features
Both Upper and Lower Sorbian have the dual for nouns, pronouns, adjectives, and verbs; very few living Indo-European languages retain this as a productive feature of the grammar. As with most Slavic languages, Sorbian uses no articles.

Grammar
The Sorbian languages are declined in six or seven cases:
Nominative
Accusative
Genitive
Dative
Locative
Instrumental
Vocative (Upper Sorbian only)

Vocabulary comparison
The following is selected vocabulary from the two Sorbian languages compared with other Slavic languages.

See also
 Sorbian alphabet
 List of Sorbian-language writers
 Low Lusatian German
 White Serbia

References

External links
 Online course for Upper and Lower Sorbian (English, Sorbian, German)
 Euromosaic information page
 Kurs serskeje rěce / Bluń, introductory texts of the lessons included in the Sorbian language textbook Curs practic de limba sorabă 
 website for Lětopis, journal devoted to Sorbian topics 

Sorbian languages
West Slavic languages
Languages of Germany
Languages
Culture of Saxony